Statistics of the 1981 Cameroonian Premier League season.

Overview
Tonnerre Yaoundé won the championship.

References
Cameroon 1981 - List of final tables (RSSSF)

1981 in Cameroonian football
Cam
Cam
Elite One seasons